Vrelo Krušnice is a large karstic wellspring of the river Krušnica, located between Gudavac and Vranjska villages, municipality Bosanska Krupa, Una-Sana Canton, Bosnia and Herzegovina.

References

Springs of Bosnia and Herzegovina
Karst springs of Bosnia and Herzegovina
Caves of Bosnia and Herzegovina
Karst caves of Bosnia and Herzegovina
SVrelo Krušnice